Including players from the Wests Tigers that have represented while at the club and the years they  achieved their honours, if known. Representatives from the Western Suburbs Magpies (NSW Cup) and Balmain Ryde-Eastwood Tigers are included as they were feeder clubs.

International

Australia
    Scott Prince (2005)
    Robbie Farah (2009–10, 2012–14)
    Lote Tuqiri  (2010)
    Chris Lawrence  (2010–11)
    Keith Galloway  (2011)
    Aaron Woods  (2014–17)

New Zealand
    Jason Lowrie (2000)
    Tyran Smith (2000)
    Dene Halatau (2004–09)
    Paul Whatuira (2005–07)
    Benji Marshall (2005–12, 2019)
    Bronson Harrison (2005, 2008)
    Taniela Tuiaki (2007)
    Adam Blair (2012, 2014)
    Martin Taupau (2014–15)
    Russell Packer (2017)
    Elijah Taylor (2017)
    Esan Marsters (2018–19)
    Isaiah Papali'i (2022)

England
    Gareth Ellis (2009–11)
    Chris Heighington (2011)

Tonga
    Richard Villasanti (2000)
    Willie Manu (2000)
    Taniela Tuiaki (2006)
    Willie Mataka (2009)
    Andrew Fifita   (2010)
    Ben Murdoch-Masila (2013)
    Sitaleki Akauola (2014)
    Asipeli Fine (2014)
    Haveatama Luani (2014–15)
    Delouise Hoeter (2014–15)
    Moses Suli (2017)
    Tuimoala Lolohea (2017–18)

Samoa
    Laloa Milford (2000)
    Ben Te'o (2008)
    Masada Iosefa (2013)
    Eddy Pettybourne (2013)
    Sauaso Sue (2013–17)
    Tim Simona (2014–16)
    David Nofoaluma (2016, 2019-22)
    Michael Chee-Kam (2018–19)
    Josh Aloiai (2018–19)
    Pita Godinet (2018)
    Fa'amanu Brown (2022)
    Kelma Tuilagi (2022)

Fiji
    Marika Koroibete (2013–14)
    Kevin Naiqama (2015–18)
    Taane Milne (2017)
    Joseph Ratuvakacereivalu (2019)

Papua New Guinea
    Rod Griffin (2016)

Cook Islands
    Manikura Tikinau (2009)
    Keith Lulia (2013)
    Chance Peni (2015–16)
    Esan Marsters (2015, 2017)
    Rua Ngatikaura (2022)

Lebanon
    Hassan Saleh (2001–02)
    Andrew Kazzi (2017)
    Jaleel Seve-Derbas (2017)
    Christian Yassmin (2017)
    Alex Twal (2017)
    Robbie Farah (2019)
    Adam Doueihi (2022)
    Michael Tannous (2022)

Greece
    Braith Anasta (2013)

Italy
    James Tedesco (2013, 2017)
    Brenden Santi (2013)
    Nathan Milone (2017)

Ireland
    Ryan Tandy (2008)
    Pat Richards (2013)
    Henry O'Kane (2022)

United States
    Joel Luani (2013)
    Eddy Pettybourne (2013)

Serbia
    Jordan Grant (2016)

State Of Origin

New South Wales
    Terry Hill (2000)
    Brett Hodgson (2006)
    Robbie Farah (2009, 2012–16)
    Keith Galloway (2011)
    Aaron Woods (2013–17)
    James Tedesco (2016–17)

Queensland
    Scott Prince (2004)
    Moses Mbye (2019)
    Harry Grant (2020) (on loan from Melbourne Storm)
    Joe Ofahengaue (2021)

New South Wales Women
    Botille Vette-Welsh (2019–21)

All Stars Game

NRL All Stars
    Benji Marshall (2010–13)
    Robbie Farah (2010, 2013)
    Liam Fulton (2011)
    Adam Blair (2012)
    Luke Brooks (2015)
    Mitchell Moses (2017)

Māori All Stars
    Zane Musgrove (2021)
    Russell Packer (2021)
    Tukimihia Simpkins (2023)

Indigenous All Stars
 Brent Naden (2023)
 Daine Laurie (2023)

City Vs Country Origin

NSW City
    Ben Galea (2001)
    John Skandalis (2002, 2004–06)
    Darren Senter (2002)
    Kevin McGuinness (2002)
    Brett Hodgson (2004–06, 2008)
    Robbie Farah (2006–07, 2009–12)
    Bryce Gibbs (2007–08, 2010)
    Dean Collis (2007)
    Keith Galloway (2009–11)
    Chris Lawrence (2010, 2012, 2016)
    Liam Fulton (2011–12)
    Simon Dwyer (2011)
    Aaron Woods (2012, 2014)
    James Tedesco (2013, 2015)
    Curtis Sironen (2013, 2015, 2016)
    Joel Reddy (2013)
    David Nofoaluma (2016)
    Kyle Lovett (2016)

NSW Country
    Anthony Laffranchi (2006)
    Chris Heighington (2008, 2011)
    Tim Moltzen (2011)

Other honours

Prime Minister's XIII
    Robbie Farah (2006, 2008–09, 2013–14)
    Chris Lawrence (2007–08, 2012)
    Chris Heighington (2008–09)
    Beau Ryan (2012)
    Aaron Woods (2012, 2014, 2016–17)
    David Nofoaluma (2015)
    James Tedesco (2016–17)
    Mitchell Moses (2016)
    Daine Laurie (2022)
    Luke Garner (2022)
    Jake Simpkin (2022)

Indigenous Dreamtime Team
    Daine Laurie (2008)

All Golds
    Benji Marshall (2008)

New Zealand Māori
    Tyran Smith (2000)
    Kylie Leuluai (2000)

Representative Captains

Test Captains
New Zealand
    Benji Marshall (2008–12, 2019)

Fiji
    Kevin Naiqama (2016–18)

State of Origin
New South Wales
    Robbie Farah (2013, 2015)

City Vs Country Origin
NSW City
    Brett Hodgson (2008)
    Robbie Farah (2009–12)
    Chris Lawrence (2016)

Prime Minister's XIII
    Aaron Woods (2017)

All Stars Game
NRL All Stars
    Benji Marshall (2012–13)

Representative Coaching Staff

International
Australia
    Tim Sheens (Coach - 2009–12)

New Zealand
    Michael Maguire (2019)

State Of Origin
New South Wales
    Wayne Pearce (Coach - 2000)

City Vs Country Origin
NSW City
    Tim Sheens (Coach - 2006–08)

References

 
Representatives
Rugby league representative players lists
National Rugby League lists
Sydney-sport-related lists